Knut Sirevåg (born 26 August 1978) is a retired Norwegian football defender. He played for Bryne FK his entire senior career, from 1995 to 2006, including their period in the Norwegian Premier League.

References
Club bio 

Norwegian footballers
1978 births
Living people
Bryne FK players

Association football defenders
Place of birth missing (living people)